Medinilla is a municipality in Ávila, Castile and León, Spain. It belongs to the judicial district of Piedrahita.

Area and population
It has a surface area of 22.88 km² with a population of 156 inhabitants according to the 2006 census and a density of 6.82 inhabitants per km².

Government
The mayor is Soledad Arribas Muñoz.

References

Municipalities in the Province of Ávila